State Route 220 (SR 220) was a  long state highway located entirely in the Yakama Indian Reservation, Yakima County, Washington, United States. The highway linked Fort Simcoe State Park in the west to White Swan and Toppenish in the east. The highway had been built sometime between 1915 and 1937, and was renumbered from Secondary State Highway 3B during the 1964 state highway renumbering. The route was slated to be removed from the state highway system during the 1991 legislative session, and was removed April 1, 1992.

Route description 
SR 220 started at Fort Simcoe State Park, headed easterly along Fort Simcoe Road until it intersected Hawk Road. At the t intersection with Hawk Road, the highway turned north and follows Hawk Road until an intersection with White Swan Road. The highway turned back east along White Swan Road, passing through downtown White Swan, before turning south along Curtis Street. The highway passed over a BNSF Railway rail line, formerly part of the Toppenish, Simcoe & Western Railroad, before Curtis street turned easterly and became Fort Road. Fort Road continued almost perfectly east for about  before intersecting US Route 97 (US 97). After crossing US 97, the highway continued as a city street through west Toppenish before terminating at SR 22.

Every year the Washington State Department of Transportation (WSDOT) conducts a series of surveys on its highways in the state to measure traffic volume. This is expressed in terms of average annual daily traffic (AADT), which is a measure of traffic volume for any average day of the year. In 1991, WSDOT calculated that as few as 340 cars used the highway at the western terminus and as many as 9,300 cars at the interchange with SR 22.

History 
The highway was first constructed some time between 1915 and 1937, with a segment linking Fort Simcoe to White Swan completed by 1937. The highway was signed as Secondary State Highway 3B (SSH 3B) between White Swan and Toppenish until the 1964 state highway renumbering when the SR 220 number was applied to the highway. The original eastern terminus was US 97, but in 1971 the terminus was extended to SR 22. The highway was de-legislated in 1991 along with eleven other highways, and was removed from the system effective April 1, 1992.

Today 
All of the roads that SR 220 were routed along are still accessible, and have been designated major collector roads by WSDOT. The entirety of the former routing of SR 220 has been designated Classified Route S390.

Major intersections

References

External links 

Highways of Washington State

220
Transportation in Yakima County, Washington